Sarashi Ranjan Mukherjee (1919–1991) was an Indian surgeon and a neurobiologist. Born on 24 November 1919 in Kolkata, in the Indian state of West Bengal to Narayan Mukherjee and Kamala Devi, he was known for his studies on a number of diseases such as hypertension, hypothermia and epilepsy. He was the younger brother of Asima Chatterjee, a renowned organic chemist and was her collaborator in her researches on the pharmacological activity of marsilin, an anticonvulsant drug. The Council of Scientific and Industrial Research, the apex agency of the Government of India for scientific research, awarded him the Shanti Swarup Bhatnagar Prize for Science and Technology, one of the highest Indian science awards for his contributions to Medical Sciences in 1968. He died on 24 January 1991, at the age of 71.

References 

Recipients of the Shanti Swarup Bhatnagar Award in Medical Science
1919 births
1991 deaths
20th-century Indian medical doctors
Indian medical writers
Indian neurosurgeons
Medical doctors from Kolkata
20th-century surgeons